UFC on ESPN: Font vs. Aldo (also known as UFC on ESPN 31 and UFC Vegas 44) was a mixed martial arts event produced by the Ultimate Fighting Championship that took place on December 4, 2021 at the UFC Apex facility in Enterprise, Nevada, part of the Las Vegas Metropolitan Area, United States.

Background
A bantamweight bout between Rob Font and former WEC and two-time UFC Featherweight Champion José Aldo served as the event headliner.

Jimmy Crute and Jamahal Hill were expected to meet in a light heavyweight bout at UFC Fight Night: Santos vs. Walker, but they were eventually rescheduled for this event.

A heavyweight bout between Tanner Boser and Sergei Pavlovich was scheduled for this event. However, the bout was scrapped due to travel issues.

A middleweight bout between Maki Pitolo and Duško Todorović took place at the event. They were originally scheduled for UFC Fight Night: Rozenstruik vs. Sakai, but Pitolo pulled out due to undisclosed reasons.

A women's strawweight bout featuring Montserrat Ruiz and Mallory Martin was expected to take place at the event. However, Ruiz pulled out due to undisclosed reasons and was replaced by Cheyanne Vlismas.

Brad Tavares was expected to face Brendan Allen in a middleweight bout. He eventually pulled out in mid November and was replaced by Roman Dolidze. In turn, Dolidze was forced to pull out due to complications in his recovery from COVID-19 and was replaced by Chris Curtis.

A light heavyweight bout between William Knight and Alonzo Menifield took place at this event. They were previously expected to meet at UFC Fight Night: Rozenstruik vs. Gane and UFC 260, but the contest was cancelled both times due to positive COVID-19 tests from Menifield and Knight, respectively.

A welterweight bout between Matt Brown and Bryan Barberena was scheduled for the event. However on November 23, Brown was removed from the contest due to testing positive for COVID-19. He was replaced by Darian Weeks.

Philipe Lins was expected to face Azamat Murzakanov in a light heavyweight bout at the event. However, Lins withdrew from the event due to undisclosed reasons and he was replaced by Jared Vanderaa, therefore changing the bout to heavyweight. Shortly after the weigh-ins, officials had announced that the bout had been cancelled due to Vanderaa not being medically cleared.

A welterweight bout between Jake Matthews and Jeremiah Wells was expected to take place at the event. However, just hours before taking place, the bout was cancelled after one of Wells' cornermen tested positive for COVID-19.

Results

Bonus awards
The following fighters received $50,000 bonuses.
 Fight of the Night: Cheyanne Vlismas vs. Mallory Martin 
 Performance of the Night: Rafael Fiziev, Jamahal Hill, Clay Guida, and Chris Curtis

See also 

 List of UFC events
 List of current UFC fighters
 2021 in UFC

References 

UFC on ESPN
2021 in mixed martial arts
December 2021 sports events in the United States
2021 in sports in Nevada
Mixed martial arts in Las Vegas
Sports competitions in Las Vegas